Hockey Canada (which merged with the Canadian Amateur Hockey Association in 1994) is the national governing body of ice hockey and ice sledge hockey in Canada. It is a member of the International Ice Hockey Federation and controls the majority of organized ice hockey in Canada. There are some notable exceptions, such as the Canadian Hockey League, U Sports (formerly known as Canadian Interuniversity Sport), and Canada's professional hockey clubs; the former two are partnered with Hockey Canada but are not member organizations. Hockey Canada is based in Calgary, with a secondary office in Ottawa and regional centres in Toronto, Winnipeg and Montreal.

History
The Canadian Amateur Hockey Association was founded on December 4, 1914, when 21 delegates from across Canada met at the Chateau Laurier in Ottawa. The organization was made to oversee the amateur level of the sport at the national level. The Allan Cup, originally donated in 1908 by Sir H. Montagu Allan, was selected as the championship of amateur hockey in Canada. William Northey, the trustee of the Allan Cup, was named the first ever chairman, while Dr. W. F. Taylor was named the inaugural president. The Memorial Cup was the junior amateur championship of Canada.

In 1920, after the Winnipeg Falcons won the Allan Cup over the University of Toronto, they represented Canada at the 1920 Summer Olympic Games.  Canada would go 3-0-0 to win the sport's first ever Olympic gold medal.

The Ottawa and District Amateur Hockey Association joined in 1920, followed by the Maritime Amateur Hockey Association in 1928.

On June 30, 1947, the CAHA, the National Hockey League and the Amateur Hockey Association of the United States made an agreement that no player under the age of 18 could be signed as a professional player without the permission of their amateur club.  That same year, the International Ice Hockey Federation changed the rules on amateur status.  The rule change means the 1948 Allan Cup champion Royal Montreal Hockey Club were not eligible for the 1948 Winter Olympics, so the CAHA sent the RCAF Flyers instead and were victorious.

At the 1952 Winter Olympics, the Edmonton Mercuries won their nation's last Olympic gold until 2002.

In 1961, the Trail Smoke Eaters won Canada's 19th and last world championship for 33 years at the 1961 World Ice Hockey Championships.  In 1964, Father David Bauer formed  Canada's national team in response to the success of the programs set up by the Soviet Union, Czechoslovakia, and Sweden.  Three years later, the CAHA opened its first ever national office, located in Winnipeg.

The Newfoundland Amateur Hockey Association, led by association president Don Johnson, entered the CAHA in 1966.  Johnson became CAHA president in 1975.  The New Brunswick Amateur Hockey Association left the Maritime AHA brand in 1968 and entered the CAHA as a member.

1968 to 1994

In 1968, the Hockey Canada organization was founded to oversee Canada's national teams.

In 1970, the CAHA's 13 Junior A league were divided into two tiers.  Tier I, the Western Canada Junior Hockey League, the Ontario Hockey Association, and the Quebec Major Junior Hockey League, were eligible to compete for the Memorial Cup.  The ten leagues of Tier II, would compete for the Manitoba Centennial Cup, donated by the Manitoba Amateur Hockey Association (See: Canadian Junior Hockey League).

Also in 1970, Canada pulled out of IIHF competition and would not return to the fold until 1977 in protest of the IIHF's soft stance on Soviet and Czechoslovakian teams using "professional amateurs" in international competition but not allowing professional players to compete for Canada.

In 1972, Canada and the Soviet Union competed in the 1972 Summit Series.  Canada's team was composed of NHL stars, while the Soviet players were from the Red Army.  The NHLers won the series 4-3-1.  Two years later, the World Hockey Association represented Canada and lost the series 1-4-3.  In 1976, the Canada Cup was formed as a best-on-best championship.

In 1974, the Nova Scotia Amateur Hockey Association and Prince Edward Island Amateur Hockey Association are formed out of the dissolution of the Maritime AHA.

The World Junior Ice Hockey Championships was held for the first time.  Canada, who sent Memorial Cup champion teams in early years, eventually set up a national team and won their first gold medal at the 1982 World Junior Ice Hockey Championships.

In 1975, the QMJHL, WCJHL, and the renamed Ontario Major Junior Hockey League form an umbrella organization known as the Canadian Major Junior Hockey League.  With the creation of the CMJHL, the three league began initiating compensation talks with the NHL and WHA without CAHA input.  In 1980, the CMJHL separated from the CAHA, only staying loosely affiliated with the national body.  With the separation of the CMJHL, Tier II was promoted to simply Junior A, although the Tier II title still persists in hockey vernacular.  To this day, the CMJHL (now Canadian Hockey League) releases its players to Hockey Canada to play at the World Junior Ice Hockey Championships.

In 1983, the first Abby Hoffman Cup was awarded to the Burlington Ladies as the Canadian national senior champions of women's hockey.

In 1990, the forerunner to the Canadian Junior Hockey League was created as an umbrella organization, within the CAHA, to oversee Junior A hockey.

The Canada women's national ice hockey team was formed in 1987 and won the first (unofficial) world championship that year.  The 1990 IIHF Women's World Championship was the first official event, also won by Canada.

In 1994, Team Canada ended a 33-year drought by winning the 1994 Men's World Ice Hockey Championships.

1994 to present

In 1994, Hockey Canada and the CAHA merged into one organization.  Also, the International Olympic Committee elected to allow professional players to compete at the Olympics and created a women's event at the games.  That same year, Hockey North became the 13th branch of Hockey Canada.

The Canadian men and women won gold at the 2002 Winter Olympics in Salt Lake City.  The Canadian men win their first gold medal in fifty years, while the women win their first in two tries.

In 2004, the Canada men's national ice sledge hockey team was welcomed into the Hockey Canada fold, and Mark Aubry was named the Chief Medical Officer of Hockey Canada.

In 2006, the Canadian women won gold at the 2006 Olympics and the sledge team conquered gold at the 2006 Winter Paralympics.

The Clarkson Cup, donated by the Governor General of Canada Adrienne Clarkson, was created in 2006, and was first awarded in 2009 to the Canadian national senior champions of women's hockey.  The Clarkson Cup replaced the Abby Hoffman Cup.

Team Canada's men's and women's teams won gold in both the 2010 and 2014 Winter Olympics, hosted by Vancouver and Sochi respectively.

Tom Renney retired as chief executive officer of Hockey Canada on July 1, 2022, and was succeeded by Scott Smith who also serves as president.

Sexual assault incidents

In June 2022, a scandal emerged over Hockey Canada's handling of sexual assault allegations surrounding the organization, stemming from its May 2022 settlement of alleged abuses by members of Canada's junior team in 2018. Minister for Sport Pascale St-Onge suspended federal funding of Hockey Canada via Sport Canada, and called for an audit over whether taxpayer money was used to pay out these settlements. Later that month, the Standing Committee on Canadian Heritage opened an inquiry into the settlement. which revealed a history of sexual misconduct cases raised against Hockey Canada, and that the organization had spent C$7.6 million out of a "National Equity Fund"—funded with player registration fees—to help pay out settlements in 21 sexual misconduct cases since 1989.

Amid calls for leadership changes at Hockey Canada, Smith and the entire board of directors resigned on October 11, 2022.

List of presidents
List of Canadian Amateur Hockey Association presidents (1914–1994), and Hockey Canada presidents (1994–present). Prior to the merger of the two organizations in 1994, Hockey Canada leadership included Max Bell, Charles Hay, Doug Fisher, Lou Lefaive, Bill Hay, and Derek Holmes.

 1914–1915, W. F. Taylor
 1915–1919, James T. Sutherland
 1916–1918, J. F. Paxton (acting president)
 1919–1920, Frederick E. Betts
 1920–1921, H. J. Sterling
 1921–1922, W. R. Granger
 1922–1924, Toby Sexsmith
 1924–1926, Silver Quilty
 1926–1928, Frank Sandercock
 1928–1930, W. A. Fry
 1930–1932, Jack Hamilton
 1932–1934, Frank Greenleaf
 1934–1936, E. A. Gilroy
 1936–1938, Cecil Duncan
 1938–1940, W. G. Hardy
 1940–1942, George Dudley
 1942–1945, Frank Sargent
 1945–1947, Hanson Dowell
 1947–1950, Al Pickard
 1950–1952, Doug Grimston
 1952–1955, W. B. George
 1955–1957, Jimmy Dunn
 1957–1959, Robert Lebel
 1959–1960, Gordon Juckes
 1960–1962, Jack Roxburgh
 1962–1964, Art Potter
 1964–1966, Lionel Fleury
 1966–1968, Fred Page
 1968, Lloyd Pollock
 1969–1971, Earl Dawson
 1971–1973, Joe Kryczka
 1973–1975, Jack Devine
 1975–1977, Don Johnson
 1977–1979, Gord Renwick
 1979–1998, Murray Costello
 1998–2014, Bob Nicholson
 2014–2016, Tom Renney
 2016–2022, Scott Smith

Affiliated organizations
 British Columbia Amateur Hockey Association
 Hockey Alberta
 Hockey Eastern Ontario 
 Hockey Manitoba
 Hockey New Brunswick
 Hockey Newfoundland and Labrador
 Hockey North
 Hockey Northwestern Ontario
 Hockey Nova Scotia
 Hockey PEI
 Hockey Québec
 Hockey Saskatchewan
 Ontario Hockey Federation

Organizations in cooperation with Hockey Canada
 Canadian Junior Hockey League

On-ice officials
 Hockey Canada Officiating Program

Non-member partners
 Canadian Hockey League
 U Sports

National competitions
Allan Cup Senior "AAA"
Clarkson Cup Women's Senior
Centennial Cup Junior "A"
Telus Cup Midget (Minor)
Esso Cup Female Midget (Minor)
National Women's Under-18 Championship
Canada Games - Winter Men's U16 and Women's U18

Inter-branch
Fred Page Cup Eastern Region Junior "A"
Dudley Hewitt Cup Central Region Junior "A"
Anavet Cup Western Canada Junior "A"
Doyle Cup Pacific Canada Junior "A"
Don Johnson Cup Maritime Canada Junior "B"
Keystone Cup Western Canada Junior "B"
Maritime-Hockey North Junior C Championships Maritime/Hockey North Junior "C"
Western Shield Western Canada Female Senior "A" and "B"

Defunct
Alexander Cup Major Senior
Hardy Cup Senior "AA"/Intermediate "A"
Edmonton Journal Trophy Western Canada Intermediate "A"
Esso Women's Nationals Women's Senior
Abbott Cup Western Canada Junior "A"
J. Pius Callaghan Cup Atlantic Canada Junior "A"
Western Canada Cup Western & Pacific Junior "A"
Brewers Cup Western Canada Junior "C"

International competitions

Run by Hockey Canada
World U-17 Hockey Challenge
World Junior A Challenge
World Sledge Hockey Challenge
Hlinka Gretzky Cup (Men's U18, in partnership with the Czechia and the Slovak federations).

Run by the IIHF
Ice Hockey World Championships
IIHF World U20 Championship
IIHF World U18 Championships
IIHF World Women's U18 Championships
IIHF World Women's Championships

Run by other organizations
4 Nations Cup (Women's)
World Cup of Hockey (Men's)
Winter Olympics
Youth Olympic Games
World Para Ice Hockey Championships
Winter Paralympics

References

External links

 Hockey Canada website
 International Ice Hockey Federation website

 
1914 establishments in Canada
 
Canada
Organizations based in Calgary
Sports organizations established in 1914